Kamerunga is a suburb of Cairns in the Cairns Region, Queensland, Australia.

Geography 

The Barron River enters the suburb from the north-west (the suburb of Barron Gorge), flows through the north of Kamerunga, exiting to the north-east (the suburb of Barron). Kamerunga Island is a  island in the river in the north-west of Kamerunga. All of the island and parts of the north and south river banks form the Kamerunga Conservation Park.

Kamerunga Crossing is a ford across the Barron River to Caravonica. It is the location of an old bridge (no longer for use by vehicles).

In the east of the suburb, farmland predominates while the centre of the suburb is used for residential purposes and the west is mostly undeveloped bushland on the foothills of the Atherton Tableland escarpment.

History 

The suburb is believed to have taken its name from the Yidinji name for Barron Gorge. It was formerly known as Barronville.

From 1890 to 1919, Kamerunga was within the Shire of Barron, but was then absorbed into the Shire of Cairns (now the Cairns Region).

In 1911 a ferro-concrete bridge was opened at Kamerunga Crossing which provided a dry crossing of the Barron River (except in floods). It was designed by Cairns Harbour Board engineer Charles Norton Boult. A new high-level road bridge opened in 1980 to replace the original bridge (now known as Kamerunga Lower Bridge), which has been retained for walking, cycling and fishing.

Kamerunga State School opened on 28 May 1913. It was wrecked in a cyclone in February 1927. On 6 April 1927 it reopened at a new location as Caravonica State School. The decision to relocate the school had been taken prior to the cyclone.

Peace Lutheran College opened in 1994.

Education
Peace Lutheran College is a private primary and secondary (Prep-12) school for boys and girls at Cowley Street. In 2018, the school had an enrolment of 670 students with 52 teachers (46 full-time equivalent) and 48 non-teaching staff (34 full-time equivalent).

There are no government schools in Kamerunga. The nearest government primary schools are Caravonica State School in neighbouring Caravonica to the north and Freshwater State School in neighbouring Freshwater to the east. The nearest government secondary school is Redlynch State College in neighbouring Redlynch to the south.

Amenities 
St John the Forerunner & Baptist Greek Orthodox Church is at 450-482 Kamerunga Road.
There are a number of parks, including:

 Barronville Park between Romney and Hastings Street
Douglas Track South Park, end of Douglas Track Road

 Douglas Track Park

 Harley Street North Park

References

External links 

Towns in Queensland
Suburbs of Cairns
1980 establishments in Australia
Populated places established in 1980